The Honorary Medal for Merits toward Museum Collections, also known as the Museum Medal, is one of the oldest civil decorations of the Netherlands. It was created by royal decree on 26 June 1817 by King William I of the Netherlands. The decree describes the following: "Erepenning voor blijken van belangstelling in 's Rijksverzamelingen door schenking betoond". The medal is awarded in gold, silver or bronze as a token of appreciation to those who "aan hen, die enig boek- of kunstwerk, dat de vrucht van hun arbeid was, de Koning deden toekomen".

By royal decree, on 5 May 1877, eligibility for this award was extended by King William III of the Netherlands, with the description "aan hen, die door het aanbieden van belangrijke geschenken of op andere wijze zich verdienstelijk hebben gemaakt ten opzichte van de verschillende wetenschappelijke en kunstverzamelingen des Rijks". Due to this description, the medal obtained its current official name. However, since the end of the 19th century, this decoration is primarily known as the "Museum Medal". Up until 1897, the honorary medal was only a standing decoration, when Queen Wilhelmina of the Netherlands declared that the medal could be worn suspended from a ribbon.

Eligibility for this award was once again extending, by Queen Wilhelmina, on 28 October 1919 with the description "verdiensten jegens gemeentelijke (openbare) verzamelingen" (English: merit towards community (public) collections). What was initially a medal for generous donors became now an official royal award for merit. Queen Juliana of the Netherlands decided by royal decree on 26 July 1952 that the shape of the medal and ribbon should be changed. The current ribbon is orange with two red lines descending down the middle. A ribbon bar is also given with the award, with a palm branch device in either gold or silver for recipients of the gold or silver versions of the medal, respectively. Queen Beatrix of the Netherlands later changed the composition of the medallion, and is now depicted on the obverse of the medal.

Notable recipients

 Willem, Baron van Dedem - art collector
Rudi Fuchs - Dutch art historian and former director of the Stedelijk Museum Amsterdam
Dollie Defesche-Bakker - widow of Pieter Defesche, a former Dutch visual artist
Rosetta C. Musaph-Andriesse - former director of the Jewish Historical Museum Amsterdam
A.W. Swaanswijk-Koek - widow of Lucebert, a former Dutch painter
Johan Wertheim - a Dutch sculptor
A.R. Wittop Koning - a Dutch architect

Orders, decorations, and medals of the Netherlands
1817 establishments in the Netherlands
Awards established in 1817